Bastar Lok Sabha constituency is one of the 11 Lok Sabha (parliamentary) constituencies in Chhattisgarh state in central India. This Lok Sabha constituency is reserved for the Scheduled Tribes (ST) candidates.

Assembly segments
Like most other Lok Sabha seats in MP and Chhattisgarh, with few seats like Durg (which has nine assembly segments under it) being exceptions, Bastar Lok Sabha seat has 8 assembly seats as its segments. Bastar seat is composed of the following assembly segments:

Members of Parliament

^ by poll

Election results

General election 2019

General election 2014

Bypoll 2011

General election 2009

See also
 Bastar district
 Dantewada district
 List of Constituencies of the Lok Sabha

References

External links
Bastar lok sabha  constituency election 2019 date and schedule

Lok Sabha constituencies in Chhattisgarh
Bastar district
Dantewada district
Bijapur district, Chhattisgarh
Narayanpur district